17314 Aisakos  is a Jupiter trojan from the Trojan camp, approximately  in diameter. It was discovered at the Palomar Observatory during the first Palomar–Leiden Trojan survey in 1971. The dark Jovian asteroid has a rotation period of 9.7 hours. It was named after the Trojan prince Aesacus from Greek mythology.

Discovery 

Aisakos was discovered on 25 March 1971, by Dutch astronomer couple Ingrid and Cornelis van Houten at Leiden, on photographic plates taken by Dutch–American astronomer Tom Gehrels at Palomar Observatory in the Palomar Mountain Range, southeast of Los Angeles. The body's observation arc begins with a precovery taken at Palomar in November 1954, more than 16 years prior to its official discovery observation.

Palomar–Leiden Trojan survey 

The survey designation "T-1" stands for the first Palomar–Leiden Trojan survey, named after the fruitful collaboration of the Palomar and Leiden Observatory in the 1960s and 1970s. Gehrels used Palomar's Samuel Oschin telescope (also known as the 48-inch Schmidt Telescope), and shipped the photographic plates to Ingrid and Cornelis van Houten at Leiden Observatory where astrometry was carried out. The trio are credited with the discovery of several thousand asteroids.

Naming 

This minor planet was named from Greek mythology after the Trojan prince Aesacus (Aisakos), son of King Priam and his first wife Arisbe. As had been his maternal grandfather Merops, he was a seer and foresaw the downfall of Troy, brought upon by Hecuba's future son, Paris. The official naming citation was published by the Minor Planet Center on 9 March 2001.

Orbit and classification 

Aisakos is a Jupiter trojan in a 1:1 orbital resonance with Jupiter. It is located in the trailering Trojan camp at the Gas Giant's  Lagrangian point, 60° behind its orbit . It is also a non-family asteroid in the Jovian background population. It orbits the Sun at a distance of 4.8–5.6 AU once every 11 years and 9 months (4,288 days; semi-major axis of 5.17 AU). Its orbit has an eccentricity of 0.07 and an inclination of 11° with respect to the ecliptic.

Physical characteristics 

Aisakos is an assumed C-type asteroid, while most larger Jupiter trojans are D-types.

Rotation period 

In October 2014, a rotational lightcurve of Aisakos was obtained from photometric observations over three consecutive nights by Robert Stephens at the Center for Solar System Studies in Landers, California. Lightcurve analysis gave a well-defined rotation period of  hours with a brightness amplitude of 0.34 magnitude.

Diameter and albedo 

According to the survey carried out by the NEOWISE mission of NASA's Wide-field Infrared Survey Explorer, Aisakos measures 35.76 kilometers in diameter and its surface has an albedo of 0.072, while the Collaborative Asteroid Lightcurve Link assumes a standard albedo for a carbonaceous asteroid of 0.057 and calculates a diameter of 36.78 kilometers based on an absolute magnitude of 10.9.

Notes

References

External links 
 Asteroid Lightcurve Database (LCDB), query form (info )
 Dictionary of Minor Planet Names, Google books
 Discovery Circumstances: Numbered Minor Planets (15001)-(20000) – Minor Planet Center
 Asteroid 17314 Aisakos at the Small Bodies Data Ferret
 
 

017314
Discoveries by Cornelis Johannes van Houten
Discoveries by Ingrid van Houten-Groeneveld
Discoveries by Tom Gehrels
1024
Named minor planets
19710325